Karen Van Nest (born 29 September 1962) is a Canadian Paralympic archer and Parapan American Games medalist.

She has competed at the Summer Paralympics in archery since 2012, having previously competed in shooting. She switched from shooting to archery after the Beijing Olympics after she experienced problems with her right shoulder.

References

External links
 
 

1962 births
Living people
Archers at the 2012 Summer Paralympics
Archers at the 2016 Summer Paralympics
Canadian female archers
Paralympic archers of Canada
Paralympic shooters of Canada
Shooters at the 2000 Summer Paralympics
Shooters at the 2004 Summer Paralympics
Shooters at the 2008 Summer Paralympics
Sportspeople from North Bay, Ontario
Medalists at the 2015 Parapan American Games